Myrna Summers (born March 30, 1949) is a gospel music singer who has performed professionally for over four decades and is now the Minister of Music at Reid Temple A.M.E. Church in Glenn Dale, Maryland.
She has a commanding yet distinctive alto voice.

Summers was born in Washington D.C. in 1949. Her parents were members of the Church of God in Christ (COGIC), and she performed in services at the Refreshing Spring Church in Riverdale, Maryland from a very early age. 
She attended the McKinley Tech High School, and went on to the University of Maryland and the Toutorsky Academy of Music.

She formed a group the Refreshingnettes in the early 1960s. The group recorded "Pray Your Troubles / I'm Determined" for HOB Records.
Her original compositions "God Gave Me a Song" (1970) and "Give Me Something to Hold on To" (1979) earned her Grammy Award nominations.
She was the 1970 recipient of the Gospel Music Workshop of America's Mahalia Jackson Award.
Her album entitled "We Going To Make It" became one of her best selling recordings in June 1988 and won a 1989 Stellar Award for Best Traditional Gospel Artist (Female). 
She is known for her collaborations with Timothy Wright, the Dallas Fort-Worth Mass Choir and Ambassadors for Christ.

She has performed at Madison Square Garden, the Apollo Theater and the Lincoln Center in New York and at the Kennedy Center in Washington, D.C.
Summers was Minister of Music at Refreshing Spring COGIC before joining Reid Temple A.M.E Church in 1999.
As Minister of Music at Reid Temple she is the leader of the church’s five choirs and orchestra, and the Director of the Mass Choir.
The choir led by Summers provides a stirring accompaniment to the preaching and prayers at the megachurch.

Discography

Myrna Summers has recorded on more than 50 albums.
A select list follows.

References

Living people
1949 births
American gospel singers
People from Glenn Dale, Maryland
People from Washington, D.C.